The Cité de l'architecture et du patrimoine (Architecture and Heritage City) is a museum of architecture and monumental sculpture located in the Palais de Chaillot (Trocadéro), in Paris, France. Its permanent collection is also known as Musée national des monuments français (National Museum of French Monuments). It was established in 1879 by Eugène Viollet-le-Duc. The museum was renovated in 2007 and covers 9,000 square meters of gallery space. Alongside temporary exhibitions, it is made of three permanent exhibits :

 Galerie des moulages: casts of monumental French architecture from the 12th to the 18th centuries, such as portals of cathedrals.
 Galerie des peintures murales et des vitraux: copies of murals and stained glasses from French Romanesque and Gothic churches.
 Galerie moderne et contemporaine: models of French and international architecture from 1850 to the present day.

The Cité also houses:
 the Institut français d'architecture (French Institute of Architecture), for the promotion of French architecture and contemporary architects.
 the École de Chaillot (School of Chaillot) founded in 1887 for the training of architects specialising in the restoration of historical monuments.
 a library of architecture
The Cité supported the Global Award for Sustainable Architecture launch in 2006 by the architect and professor Jana Revedin. Placed under the patronage of the UNESCO from 2010, the prize is awarded to 5 architects every year since 2007, at the Cité.

Gallery

See also 
 List of museums in Paris
 Architecture museums

References

External links 

 

Museums in Paris
Architecture museums
Art museums established in 2007
2007 establishments in France
Buildings and structures in the 16th arrondissement of Paris